The 1996 Big League World Series took place from August 9–17 in Fort Lauderdale, Florida, United States. Kaohsiung, Taiwan defeated Burbank, Illinois in the championship game. It was Taiwan's fourth straight championship,

Teams

Results

United States Bracket

International Bracket

Elimination round

References

Big League World Series
Big League World Series